The North Plainfield School District is a comprehensive community public school district that serves students in pre-kindergarten through twelfth grade from North Plainfield in Somerset County, New Jersey, United States. The district also houses a comprehensive Adult High School and an Adult Community School which offers educational programs for North Plainfield and neighboring community residents.

As of the 2018–19 school year, the district, comprising six schools, had an enrollment of 3,342 students and 304.0 classroom teachers (on an FTE basis), for a student–teacher ratio of 11.0:1.

The district is classified by the New Jersey Department of Education as being in District Factor Group "DE", the fifth-highest of eight groupings. District Factor Groups organize districts statewide to allow comparison by common socioeconomic characteristics of the local districts. From lowest socioeconomic status to highest, the categories are A, B, CD, DE, FG, GH, I and J.

Schools
Schools in the district (with 2018–19 enrollment data from the National Center for Education Statistics) are:
Elementary schools
East End Elementary School (423 students; in grades PreK–4)
Stony Brook Elementary School (253; PreK–4)
West End Elementary School (488; K–4)
Middle school
Somerset Intermediate School (516; 5–6)
Middle / High school
North Plainfield Middle School (544; 7–8)
North Plainfield High School (1,052; 9–12) is certified by the New Jersey Department of Education and accredited by the Middle States Association of Colleges and Schools, offers a comprehensive program of studies to its 7–12 enrollment.

Administration
Core members of the district's administration are:
Michelle Aquino, Superintendent
Donald Sternberg, Business Administrator / Board Secretary

Board of education
The district's board of education, with seven members, sets policy and oversees the fiscal and educational operation of the district through its administration. As a Type II school district, the board's trustees are elected directly by voters to serve three-year terms of office on a staggered basis, with either two or three seats up for election each year held (since 2012) as part of the November general election.

References

External links
North Plainfield Public Schools
 
School Data for the North Plainfield Public Schools, National Center for Education Statistics

New Jersey District Factor Group DE
North Plainfield, New Jersey
School districts in Somerset County, New Jersey